The 2009–10 Druga HNL (also known as 2. HNL) was the 19th season of Croatia's second level football competition since its establishment in 1992. Istra 1961 were league champions and were promoted to Prva HNL at the end of the previous season.

The league featured 14 clubs, playing in a double round robin league system. The season started on 22 August 2009 and ended on 29 May 2010.

Changes from last season
The following clubs have been promoted or relegated at the end of the 2008–09 season:

From 2. HNL
Promoted to 1. HNL
 Istra 1961 (winners of 2008–09 2. HNL)
 Karlovac (runners-up)
 Lokomotiva (3rd placed team)
 Međimurje (5th placed team)1

Relegated to 3. HNL
 Trogir (last-placed team)2

To 2. HNL
Relegated from 1. HNL
 None3

Promoted from 3. HNL
 Lučko (3. HNL West runners-up) 
 Rudeš (3. HNL West winners)
 RNK Split (3. HNL South winners)
 Vukovar '91 (3. HNL East fourth place)

Notes
1 Slavonac CO had finished fourth, but had to step back from promotion after they were unable to find a suitable ground for hosting Prva HNL matches. Because of this, fifth-placed Međimurje qualified automatically for promotion and sixth-placed Hrvatski Dragovoljac qualified for the two-legged promotion playoff against last placed Prva HNL team.
2 Moslavina finished 15th and also qualified for relegation, but since Slavonac CO was punished for first agreeing to enter Prva HNL and then stepping back from promotion by direct expulsion to 3.HNL, Trogir and Slavonac were the two teams relegated and Moslavina were allowed to stay in 2. HNL.
3 In a two-legged promotion/relegation playoff between Croatia Sesvete (as 12th placed 1.HNL team) and Hrvatski Dragovoljac (as 6th placed 2. HNL team), the former kept their Prva HNL status by beating Hrvatski Dragovoljac with 2–1 on aggregate (0–0, 2–1) on 14 June 2009.

Clubs

(As of 9 July 2009, two out of the 16 clubs which were supposed to take part in 2. HNL failed to meet UEFA competition requirements and were refused licences. These were Zmaj Makarska and NK Đakovo.)

League table

Results

Top goalscorers
The top scorers in the 2009–10 Druga HNL season were:

See also 
2009–10 Croatian First Football League
2009–10 Croatian Football Cup

References

External links
Official website  

First Football League (Croatia) seasons
Drug
Cro